Morristown station is a historic train station located at Morristown, Shelby County, Indiana. It was built in 1867–1868 by the Junction Railroad, and is a simple one-story, rectangular, building of pinned beam construction. The building served as both a grain elevator and train depot. It was moved to its present site in 1976 to prevent it from demolition.

It was listed on the National Register of Historic Places in 1979 as the Junction Railroad Depot.

References

Railway stations on the National Register of Historic Places in Indiana
Railway stations in the United States opened in 1868
Former Baltimore and Ohio Railroad stations
National Register of Historic Places in Shelby County, Indiana
Transportation buildings and structures in Shelby County, Indiana